Naesiotus achatellinus is a species of  tropical air-breathing land snail, a pulmonate gastropod mollusk in the subfamily Bulimulinae.

This species is endemic to Ecuador. Its natural habitat is subtropical or tropical dry forests. It is threatened by habitat loss.

References

Orthalicidae
Taxa named by Henry Ogg Forbes
Gastropods described in 1850
Taxonomy articles created by Polbot
Taxobox binomials not recognized by IUCN